Cambridgeshire Fire and Rescue Service is the statutory fire and rescue service for the non-metropolitan county of Cambridgeshire and the unitary authority of Peterborough.

Cambridgeshire Fire and Rescue Service was formed in 1974 from the merger of the Cambridgeshire and Isle of Ely Fire Brigade and the Huntingdon and Peterborough Fire Brigade (which had been formed in 1965 from the merger of Huntingdonshire Fire Brigade and the Soke of Peterborough Fire Brigade); all of which had existed since 1948.

Cambridgeshire Fire and Rescue Service's headquarters are located in Huntingdon.

Performance
In 2018/2019, every fire and rescue service in England and Wales was subjected to a statutory inspection by His Majesty's Inspectorate of Constabulary and Fire & Rescue Services (HIMCFRS). Another cycle of inspections was carried out starting in 2021.The inspections investigate how well the service performs in each of three areas. On a scale of outstanding, good, requires improvement and inadequate, Cambridgeshire Fire and Rescue Service was rated as follows:

Fire stations 
Cambridgeshire Fire and Rescue Service operates 28 fire stations, of which four are crewed 24/7 (Wholetime) and three are crewed 08:0018:00 (Day Crewed) with On-Call cover at night. The remainder are purely crewed by On-Call firefighters, who live or work near to their fire station and can arrive within five minutes of a call being received. 

Peterborough also has a separate 'volunteer fire brigade' (Peterborough Volunteer Fire Brigade) whose training, equipment and mobilisation falls under Cambridgeshire Fire and Rescue Service. It is crewed by volunteers, in exactly the same way as the On-Call firefighters do, but they do not get paid.

Fire authority
Cambridgeshire County Council was the fire authority until 1998 when Cambridgeshire and Peterborough Fire Authority was formed following local government reorganisation in the county. The fire authority comprises 17 elected councillors, 13 from Cambridgeshire County Council and four from Peterborough city council. The full authority meets four times a year at Service headquarters, situated at Hinchingbrooke Cottage on the outskirts of Huntingdon. Meetings are open to the general public.

See also

 Fire service in the United Kingdom
 History of fire brigades in the United Kingdom
 Cambridgeshire Constabulary
 East of England Ambulance Service
 List of British firefighters killed in the line of duty

References

External links
 
Cambridgeshire Fire and Rescue Service at HMICFRS

Fire and rescue services of England
Local government in Cambridgeshire
Organizations established in 1974
1974 establishments in England